M&B may refer to:
May & Baker, a British chemical company
 the drug Sulfapyridine, manufactured by May & Baker
 Mills & Boon, the romance imprint of British publisher Harlequin UK Ltd.
Meridian and Bigbee Railroad, a U.S. railroad
Mount & Blade, a computer game
Mitchells & Butlers, a British pub chain company
Mitchells & Butlers Brewery